The Pampanga International Circuit, is a motor racing and kart racing venue located in Alviera, Porac, Pampanga, Philippines. It is operated by the City Kart Racing Group and hosts the Sodi World Series and the Rotax Max Asia Challenge in the Philippines. Opened to the general public in 2019, the circuit features short and long course layouts.

History 

The circuit, located inside the SandBox Adventure Park in Porac, Pampanga, opened to the public on November 30, 2019 after two years of design and construction. To mark the grand opening of the Pampanga International Circuit, it hosted back-to-back events over a 3-day race weekend from November 29 to December 1. The 12 Hour Sodi World Series (SWS) Endurance Race then followed, where 13 teams competed round-the-clock from dusk ’til dawn. It obtained CIK-FIA homologation shortly after.

Its main investor and operator is the City Kart Racing Group who also operates and runs  City Kart Racing at Circuit Makati.

See also 

 Clark International Speedway
 Porac, Pampanga

References

External links 

 City Kart Racing Website
 Pampanga International Circuit on Facebook
 City Kart Racing Pampanga on Facebook

Motorsport venues in the Philippines
Sports in Pampanga
Buildings and structures in Pampanga